Ingolstadt is an electoral constituency (German: Wahlkreis) represented in the Bundestag. It elects one member via first-past-the-post voting. Under the current constituency numbering system, it is designated as constituency 216. It is located in central Bavaria, comprising the city of Ingolstadt, the district of Eichstätt, and the northern part of the Neuburg-Schrobenhausen district.

Ingolstadt was created for the inaugural 1949 federal election. Since 2009, it has been represented by Reinhard Brandl of the Christian Social Union (CSU).

Geography
Ingolstadt is located in central Bavaria. As of the 2021 federal election, it comprises the independent city of Ingolstadt, the district of Eichstätt, and the municipalities of Bergheim, Burgheim, Ehekirchen, Karlshuld, Karlskron, Königsmoos, Neuburg an der Donau, Oberhausen, Rennertshofen, Rohrenfels, and Weichering from the district of Neuburg-Schrobenhausen.

History
Ingolstadt was created in 1949. In the 1949 election, it was Bavaria constituency 3 in the numbering system. In the 1953 through 1961 elections, it was number 198. In the 1965 through 1972 elections, it was number 202. In the 1976 election, it was number 203. In the 1980 through 1998 elections, it was number 202. In the 2002 and 2005 elections, it was number 218. In the 2009 and 2013 elections, it was number 217. Since the 2017 election, it has been number 216.

Originally, the constituency comprised the independent city of Ingolstadt and the districts of Landkreis Ingolstadt, Aichach, Pfaffenhofen, and Schrobenhausen. In the 1976 through 2009 elections, it comprised the city of Ingolstadt and the districts of Eichstätt and Neuburg-Schrobenhausen. In the 2013 election, it lost the municipality of Aresing from the Neuburg-Schrobenhausen district. It acquired its current borders in the 2017 election.

Members
The constituency has been held by the Christian Social Union (CSU) during all but one Bundestag term since its creation. It was first represented by Hermann Aumer from 1949 to 1953. He was elected for the Bavaria Party (BP), expelled in 1950, and served the remainder of the term as an independent. Hans Demmelmeier won it for the CSU in 1953 and served until 1961. Paul Weinzierl then served one term. Karl Heinz Gierenstein was representative from 1965 to 1980. Horst Seehofer was elected in 1980 and served until 2008, a total of eight consecutive terms. He resigned in 2008 to become Minister-President of Bavaria. Reinhard Brandl was elected in 2009, and re-elected in 2013, 2017, and 2021.

Election results

2021 election

2017 election

2013 election

2009 election

Notes

References

Federal electoral districts in Bavaria
1949 establishments in West Germany
Constituencies established in 1949
Ingolstadt
Eichstätt (district)
Neuburg-Schrobenhausen